is a town located in Kamikawa Subprefecture, Hokkaido, Japan.

As of March 31, 2017, the town has an estimated population of 1,585 and a density of 2.7 persons per km2. The total area is 594.87 km2.

Climate

Culture

Mascot

He is a shape-shaping leaf who lives in a green town since the town's ancient times. He was discovered in September 2012.

References

External links

Official Website 

Towns in Hokkaido